Richard Bulkeley, of Llangefni and Porthamel, Llanidan, Anglesey, was a Welsh politician.

He was the eldest son of Rowland Bulkeley of Beaumaris, Anglesey.

He was a Justice of the Peace for Anglesey from c.1593 and was appointed High Sheriff of Anglesey for  1597–98 and 1601–02. He was elected a Member (MP) of the Parliament of England for Anglesey 1589.

He married twice: firstly Mary, the daughter of William Lewis of Presaddfed Hall, Bodedern, with whom he had 4 sons and 5 daughters and secondly Elizabeth, the daughter of Rhys Wynn of Bodychen, Llandrygarn, and possibly the widow of Rowland Bulkeley of Cemlyn, nr. Llanidan, with whom he had two more daughters.

References

 

Year of birth missing
Year of death missing
16th-century Welsh politicians
English MPs 1589
Members of the Parliament of England (pre-1707) for constituencies in Wales
High Sheriffs of Anglesey
Bulkeley family